
Lago Sfundau is a lake in Ticino, Switzerland.

See also
List of mountain lakes of Switzerland

References

Lakes of Ticino
Reservoirs in Switzerland